The Sri Lanka Mahajana Pakshaya (SLMP; Sri Lanka People's Party) is a political party in Sri Lanka, founded in 1984 by Vijaya Kumaranatunga.

History

1980s
Vijaya Kumaranatunga founded the party in 1984 and led it until his assassination in 1988. His wife, Chandrika Kumaranatunga, led the party for a short time after his death.

The SLMP supported the Provincial Council Act and ran against the United National Party (UNP) in 1988. The SLMP candidate, Ossie Abeygunasekera, placed third in that year's presidential election with 235,719 votes (4.63%). Abeygunasekara served as the party's leader until he crossed over to the UNP in 1993.

The party lost 117 leading members during the revolution of 1988–89, including Vijaya Kumaranatunga, Pohoddaramulle Pemaloka Thero, T. B. Wijesuriya, and Deva Bandara Senarathne.

Shortly after Kumaranatunga's assassination, the SLMP joined with the Communist Party of Sri Lanka, the Lanka Sama Samaja Party, and the Nava Sama Samaja Party to form the United Socialist Alliance. In the general election of 1989, the alliance received 160,271 votes (2.86%) and three seats in Parliament.

1990s 
After Abeygunasekera left the party, Y. P. de Silva became its leader. Under him, in 1993, the SLMP joined the People's Alliance.

The People's Alliance won the 1994 presidential election, and Chandrika Kumaranatunga became the president of Sri Lanka. In the general election the same year, two members were elected to Parliament: Bharatha Luxman Premachandra for the Colombo District, and Y. P. de Silva from the national list. De Silva was named deputy minister of foods.

After de Silva's death, Ranjith Navarathne became the party leader in 1997.

2000s
In the 2000 general election, Dr Ranjith Navarathne was elected to Parliament in the Kurunegala District. He signed a memorandum of understanding with the United People's Freedom Alliance in 2004. In legislative elections on 2 April 2004, the United People's Freedom Alliance won 45.6% of the popular vote and 105 out of 225 seats.

Dr Navarathne died on 1 May 2013, and his son, Asanka Nawaratne, the deputy general secretary of the party, took his place.

References

External links

 
1984 establishments in Sri Lanka
Political parties established in 1984
Political parties in Sri Lanka
Socialist Alliance (Sri Lanka)
United People's Freedom Alliance